Nankou Area is an area and a town situated on the northwestern corner of Changping District, Beijing, China. Bounded by part of Taihang Mountain Range in its north and west, Nankou borders Badaling and Jingzhuang Towns in its north, Chengnan Subdistrict and Shisanling Town in its east, Machikou and Liucun Towns in its south, and Ruiyunguan Township in its west. In 2020, it had 82,146 people under its administration.

The area got its name Nankou due to its location at the southern opening of Juyong Pass.

History

Administrative divisions 

As of 2021, Nankou Area had 39 subdivisions within its borders, composed of 11 communities, and 28 villages:

Gallery

See also 

 List of township-level divisions of Beijing

References 

Changping District
Towns in Beijing
Areas of Beijing